V. Sreekumar (31 May 1966 – 24 July 2014) was an Indian cricketer. He played two first-class matches for Kerala in 1989/90.

References

External links
 

1966 births
2014 deaths
Indian cricketers
Kerala cricketers
Cricketers from Kochi